Esselunga S.p.A. is an Italian retail store chain. Founded in 1957 by Nelson Rockefeller, Bernardo, Guido and Claudio Caprotti, Marco Brunelli, the Crespi family and other Italian associates, the company is now entirely owned by the Caprotti family through Supermarkets Italiani S.p.A.

It was the first supermarket chain in Italy to introduce on-line shopping and self-produced organic products.

With 20,000 employees, the company had a €6.8 billion turnover in 2012. Esselunga controls about 9% of the Italian grocery distribution market. It is ranked as the fourth most profitable company in the European retail sector (in proportion to its size) and it is Italy's 23rd largest company. Until 1999, Esselunga owned 50% of the Italian branch of Penny Market (a REWE group company). Esselunga stores are located mostly in Northern Italy.

Esselunga was entirely owned by Bernardo Caprotti until his death in 2016, and is not listed on the stock market.

In his will, Bernardo Caprotti left 66.7% of Esselunga to his second wife Giuliana Albera and their daughter Marina Sylvia, and 16.7% to each of his children from his first marriage, his son Giuseppe Caprotti and his daughter Violetta.

The store's name literally means "long S".

References

Sources

External links
 Esselunga (in Italian)

Companies of Italy
Retail companies of Italy
Retail companies established in 1957
Supermarkets of Italy
Companies based in Milan
Italian companies established in 1957